António Filipe Gaião Rodrigues (born 28 January 1963, in Lisbon) is a Portuguese jurist, professor and politician, former member of the Assembly of the Republic, who had been elected in representation of the Portuguese Communist Party from the Unitary Democratic Coalition's list, for the Santarém constituency, since 2009.

A licentiate in law for the University of Lisbon, he received his master's in political science from the Universidade Lusófona, and his doctorate in constitutional law from the Leiden University. António Filipe, aside from being a deputy, exercises the duties of professor in the European University (previously known as ISLA Campus Lisboa), which is part of the Laureate International Universities.

A deputy since the 5th legislature, has occupied the office of Vice-President of the Assembly of the Republic in the 9th, 10th and 12th legislatures. In local government, he was a member of the Municipal Assembly of Amadora between 1993 and 2002 and alderman of the Municipal Chamber of Amadora in 2002 and a member of the Municipal Assembly of Sintra since 2005. He was a board member of the Portuguese Communist Youth between 1986 and 1995 and is currently a member of the PCP's Central Committee.

References

1963 births
Living people
People from Lisbon
University of Lisbon alumni
Leiden University alumni
Portuguese jurists
Portuguese academics
Universidade Lusófona alumni